Louis Greenough was a pioneer who was one of the first residents of Pierre, South Dakota in what was then the Dakota Territory. With Harry Adams, he is credited with building the first automobile in South Dakota. He worked in the hardware business most of his life and was involved in civics. He served on the city commission and the School Board. He was a member of the Democratic Party and a Roman Catholic. He was born in Richmond, Vermont, on November 15, 1853. He died in 1932 of a stroke.

In 1897 Louis Greenough saw an electric powered horseless carriage at the Yanktown State Fair, which inspired him to build an internal-combustion powered automobile. With the help of Harry Adams, he added a two-cylinder Wolverine engine to a traditional wagon and built the area's first internal combustion engine driven vehicle.

References
Pringle, Ruane.  "Pierre’s First Horseless Carriage". Hughes County History-1964.
. Online. March 19, 2008.
History Of Crash Safety at Inner Auto Parts at www.innerauto.com
Statewide County, SD History - Books .....Automobiles 1925

1853 births
1932 deaths
Hardware merchants
People from Richmond, Vermont
People from Pierre, South Dakota